Finland was represented by Fredi and the Friends, with the song "Pump-Pump", at the 1976 Eurovision Song Contest,  which took place on 3 April in The Hague.

Before Eurovision

National final
The Finnish national final was held on January 31 at the YLE TV Studios in Helsinki. It was hosted by Matti Elo. The winner was chosen by regional juries.

The winning song was performed in Finnish in the national final but translated into English for the international Song Contest. The lyrics in English were written by Pertti Reponen. However the song title didn't change.

At Eurovision
On the night of the final Fredi and the Friends performed 11th in the running order following Greece and preceding Spain. The group Friends consisted of Titta Jokinen, Anneli Koivisto, Aimo Lehto, Irma Tapio and Antti Hyvärinen. The entry was conducted by Ossi Runne. At the close of voting "Pump-Pump" had picked up 44 points, placing Finland 11th of the 18 entries.

Voting

Sources
Viisukuppila- Muistathan: Suomen karsinnat 1976 
Finnish national final 1976 on natfinals

External links
Full national final  

1976
Countries in the Eurovision Song Contest 1976
Eurovision